Rui'an railway station is a railway station located in Zhejiang Province, People's Republic of China, on the Wenzhou–Fuzhou railway which is operated by Shanghai Railway Bureau, China Railway Corporation.

Railway stations in Zhejiang
Railway stations in China opened in 2009